Virgilio Olivar Garcillano (born c.1948) also known as Garci, is a former official of the Philippine Commission on Elections who allegedly was involved in Gloria Macapagal Arroyo's alleged electoral fraud in the Hello Garci scandal.

Garcillano was missing as he is suspected to be in hiding, initially abroad but recently in the country. Some sources stated that he was seen leaving the Philippines for Kota Kinabalu, Malaysia. Other sources also stated that Garcillano was seen boarding a jet en route to Singapore. Garcillano also momentarily was seen in Surigao City, particularly in a beach resort under heavy guard. An arrest warrant was issued to his last known address in Cagayan de Oro but his father-in-law refused to sign it, but it was considered served. The Philippine National Police and National Bureau of Investigation were requested by the Philippine Congress to locate Garcillano to respond to allegations in Congress.

Independent sources confirmed that Virgilio Garcillano took a flight from Subic last July 14, to Singapore, contrary to denials by Philippine authorities. He spent a night in Singapore, and then flew for London.

The management of the Bureau of Immigration, Air Transportation Office, and other government agencies were blamed for the escape of Garcillano.

Garcillano was believed to have returned in the Philippines through Sabah, Malaysia via a motorized boat on November 20. He appeared before media on November 26. He issued statements denying election rigging and admitted that he called the President. He also denied that he ever left the Philippines and having a biological relationship with Michaelangelo Zuce, an opposition witness.

In December 2006, Garcillano was cleared of perjury charges by the Department of Justice. He ran for Representative of the First Congressional District of Bukidnon in the 2007 Philippine Midterm elections in May but he lost to Candido Pancrudo, Jr. of Lakas-CMD. Garcillano resides in Baungon and Malaybalay City, Bukidnon.

Doble Controversy
An insider of Smart Communications worked with the ISAFP (Intelligence Service, Armed Forces of the Philippines) in wiretapping political leaders during the 2004 elections, and Smart admitted it was possible that an employee coordinated with ISAFP. Vidal Doble said two of his former superiors at the "Project Lighthouse" operation – Col. Paul Sumayo and Capt. Frederick Rebong – "coordinated" with a "recruit" and contact inside Smart. Ramon Isberto of Smart, said - "This first came out two to three years ago. The company has not participated in any efforts to monitor conversations." Speechless wiretappers: Doble said he and everybody else involved in "Project Lighthouse" were shocked to hear President Gloria Macapagal Arroyo speak with former Virgilio Garcillano about the rigging of poll results. Doble said "Project Lighthouse" had 14 members divided into four teams - "All of the teams knew about the conversation of PGMA (Arroyo) and commissioner Garcillano."  Doble revealed those who gave the order to launch "Project Lighthouse": Western Command (Wescom) chief Vice Admiral Tirso Danga, former deputy chief of staff for intelligence; Brigadier Gen. Marlou Quevedo, former ISAFP chief; Army Col. Allen Capuyan, former head of the ISAFP's special operations group; and "down the line" the project "group commander" Col. Sumayo; Capt. Rebong; and Capt. Lindsay Rex Sagge.

Injunction
On September 6, 2007, retired  Philippine Court of Appeals Justices Santiago Ranada and Oswaldo Agcaoili filed  (a 15-page petition for prohibition with  temporary restraining order or preliminary injunction) with the Supreme Court of the Philippines to enjoin the September 7, 2007 Senate of the Philippines  (committee on national defense) wiretap probe (on the alleged wiretapping of telephone conversations of President Gloria Macapagal Arroyo and  former election commissioner Virgilio Garcillano inter alia).

Health problems
On September 12, 2007, Garcillano was released from the Chinese General Hospital and Medical Center in the Sta. Cruz, Manila after a biopsy  due to prostate disease. Garcillano's lawyer Ed Tamondong confirmed this illness and promised that Garci will appear at the September 21 Senate of the Philippines hearing.

See also
 Samuel Ong

References

External links 
 PCIJ.org - Virgilio Garcillano
 PCIJ.org - "Gloria-Garcillano" Tapes
 PhilStar
 Garcillano's picture
 Abalos and Garcillano
 Comelec image

1948 births
Living people
Commissioners of constitutional commissions of the Philippines